Union for Europe of the Nations (UEN) was a national–conservative, Eurosceptic political group of the European Parliament active between 1999 and 2009.

History
UEN was formed on 20 July 1999 for the 5th European Parliament, supplanting the earlier Union for Europe. Its member parties Fianna Fáil (FF) and the National Alliance (AN) were the driving forces behind the group, despite their being alone in the group in their support for the proposed European Constitution. Gianfranco Fini, leader of AN, was a member of the Convention which drafted the Constitution, while Bertie Ahern, leader of FF, negotiated the treaty as President of the European Council in 2004.

UEN was a heterogeneous group: broadly Eurosceptic and national-conservative, it included some parties which were either uncomfortable with this characterisation or eventually evolved into something different. More specifically, FF was a "catch all" centre-right party and later joined the Alliance of Liberals and Democrats for Europe, AN was a conservative party which eventually joined the European People's Party through The People of Freedom, and Lega Nord was supportive of a "Europe of Regions".

After the 2009 European elections the group officially had 35 members but this figure included parties such as AN and FF, which had already committed to leave. UEN members migrated to other groups after the elections in June 2009 and before the Seventh European Parliament term started on 14 July 2009. FF had already left for the Alliance of Liberals and Democrats for Europe (ALDE) Group, For Fatherland and Freedom/LNNK and Law and Justice MEPs went to the European Conservatives and Reformists (ECR) Group, and Lega Nord, the Danish People's Party and Order and Justice MEPs went to Europe of Freedom and Democracy (EFD) Group. With this loss of members, the UEN group was dissolved by default.

Membership

1999–2004

2004–2009

2009

References

External links
Table of all groups and the number of MEPs from countries
UEN

Former European Parliament party groups
Conservatism in Europe